The 1977–78 Liga Artzit season saw Bnei Yehuda win the title and win promotion to Liga Leumit. Maccabi Petah Tikva, Hapoel Kfar Saba and Hapoel Rishon LeZion were also promoted as Liga Leumit expanded from 14 to 16 clubs.

Hapoel Beit Shemesh and Maccabi Sha'arayim were both relegated to Liga Alef.

Final table

References
1977-78 Hapoel Petah Tikva Museum 
Previous seasons The Israel Football Association

Liga Artzit seasons
Israel
2